The Elf on the Shelf: A Christmas Tradition  is a 2005 American picture book for children, written by Carol Aebersold and her daughter Chanda Bell and illustrated by Coë Steinwart. The book tells a Christmas-themed story, written in rhyme, that explains how Santa Claus knows who is naughty and nice. It describes elves visiting children from Thanksgiving to Christmas Eve, after which they return to the North Pole until the next holiday season. The Elf on the Shelf comes in a keepsake box that features a hardbound picture book and a small scout elf. The story was inspired by a family tradition started by Carol Aebersold for her twin daughters, Chanda Bell and Christa Pitts, in Georgia.

Plot
The book tells the story of a scout elf who hides in people's homes to watch over events. Once everyone goes to bed, the scout elf flies back to the North Pole to report to Santa the activities, good and bad, that have taken place throughout the day. Before the family wakes up each morning, the scout elf flies back from the North Pole and hides. By hiding in a new spot around the house each morning, the scout elf plays an ongoing game of hide and seek with the family.
The Elf on the Shelf explains that scout elves get their magic by being named and loved by a child. In the back of each book, families have an opportunity to write their elf's name and the date that they adopted it. Once the elf is named, the scout elf receives its special Christmas magic, which allows it to fly to and from the North Pole.

The book tells how the magic might disappear if the scout elf is touched, so the rule in the book states, "There's only one rule that you have to follow, so I will come back and be here tomorrow: Please do not touch me. My magic might go, and Santa won't hear all I've seen or I know." Although families are told not to touch their scout elf, they can speak to it and tell it all their Christmas wishes, so that it can report back to Santa accurately.

The story ends on Christmas Day, with the elf leaving to stay with Santa for the rest of the year, until the following Christmas season.

History

The Elf on the Shelf was written in 2004 by Carol Aebersold and her daughter Chanda Bell. Bell suggested they write a book about an old tradition of an elf sent from Santa who came to watch over children at Christmas time. Aebersold's other daughter, Christa Pitts, was recruited by the family to share her expertise in sales and marketing. Together, the trio devoted the next three years to promoting their self-published book and attending book signings and trade shows.

The Elf on the Shelf won the Best Toy Award by Learning Express, a Book of the Year Award from Creative Child Awards, and a National Best Books Award sponsored by USA Book News in 2008.

On November 26, 2011, a thirty-minute animated special, titled An Elf's Story: The Elf on the Shelf, directed by Chad Eikhoff, aired on CBS. The Washington Post criticized the quality of the animation and dismissed it as "just a half-hour advertisement for a book and a toy", which it felt would not join "the canon of prime-time animated Christmas specials that actually move the spirit". Common Sense Media disagreed, calling the special "a great addition to families' holiday TV traditions". However, they also warned parents about the consumer-driven nature of the story, and made note of its lack of educational value.

In 2012, The Elf on the Shelf made its first appearance in the Macy's Thanksgiving Day Parade, alongside fellow parade newcomers Hello Kitty and Papa Smurf. In 2013, the book hit the No. 1 spot on the USA Today bestsellers list. In October 2013, The Elf on the Shelf: A Birthday Tradition was released. Written and illustrated by the same team that created the first book, it offers instructions for inviting a scout elf to visit for a child's birthday party and describes how the elf decorates a chair for the child. In April 2014, two supplemental birthday products were released: The Elf on the Shelf Birthday Countdown Game and The Elf on the Shelf Birthday Chair Decoration Kit.

Criticism
The Atlantic columnist Kate Tuttle calls The Elf on the Shelf "a marketing juggernaut dressed up as a tradition", whose purpose is "to spy on kids". She argues that one shouldn't "bully [one's] child into thinking that good behavior equals gifts." Writing for Psychology Today, David Kyle Johnston calls it a "dangerous parental crutch", with much the same reasoning as what he terms the "Santa lie".

Many privacy organizations and researchers criticize the product for teaching children that involuntary, non-consensual surveillance is normal.  Washington Post reviewer Hank Stuever characterized the concept as "just another nannycam in a nanny state obsessed with penal codes". Professor Laura Pinto suggests that it conditions kids to accept the surveillance state and that it communicates to children that "it's okay for other people to spy on you, and you're not entitled to privacy." She argues that, "if you grow up thinking it's cool for the elves to watch me and report back to Santa, well, then it's cool for the NSA to watch me and report back to the government... The rule of play is that kids get to interact with a doll or video game or what have you, but not so with the Elf on the Shelf: The rule is that you don't touch the elf. Think about the message that sends."

Using the elf in public school classrooms has been criticized for making children feel excluded if their families do not celebrate Christmas or Santa Claus.

References

External links

 

2005 children's books
American children's books
Christmas children's books
Elves in popular culture
Christmas characters
Mass surveillance in fiction
American picture books